Park Il-kap (Hangul: 박일갑, Hanja: 朴日甲; 1 November 1923 – 11 September 1987) is a South Korean football forward who played for the South Korea in the 1954 FIFA World Cup. He also played for Seoul Football Club.

References

External links
FIFA profile

1923 births
South Korean footballers
South Korea international footballers
Association football forwards
1954 FIFA World Cup players
1987 deaths
Asian Games medalists in football
Footballers at the 1954 Asian Games
Medalists at the 1954 Asian Games
Asian Games silver medalists for South Korea